Montioni is a village in Tuscany, central Italy, administratively a frazione of the comune of Suvereto, province of Livorno. At the time of the 2001 census its population was 15.

The village is about 86 km from Livorno and 14 km from Suvereto.

References

Bibliography 
 

Frazioni of Suvereto